Coast Miwok are an indigenous people that was the second-largest group of Miwok people. Coast Miwok inhabited the general area of modern Marin County and southern Sonoma County in Northern California, from the Golden Gate north to Duncans Point and eastward to Sonoma Creek. Coast Miwok included the Bodega Bay Miwok, or Olamentko (Olamentke), from authenticated Miwok villages around Bodega Bay, the Marin Miwok, or Hookooeko (Huukuiko), and Southern Sonoma Miwok, or Lekahtewutko (Lekatuit).

Culture

The Coast Miwok spoke their own Coast Miwok language in the Utian linguistic group. They lived by hunting and gathering, and lived in small bands without centralized political authority. In the springtime they would head to the coasts to hunt salmon and other seafood, including seaweed. Otherwise their staple foods were primarily acorns—particularly from black and tan oak–nuts and wild game, such as deer and cottontail rabbits and black-tailed deer, Odocoileus hemionus columbianus, a coastal subspecies of the California mule deer, Odocoileus hemionus. When hunting deer, Miwok hunters traditionally used Brewer's angelica, Angelica breweri to eliminate their own scent. Miwok did not typically hunt bears. Yerba buena tea leaves were used medicinally.

Tattooing was a traditional practice among Coast Miwok, and they burned poison oak for a pigment. Their traditional houses, called "kotcha", were constructed with slabs of tule grass or redwood bark in a cone-shaped form.

Miwok people are skilled at basketry. A recreated Coast Miwok village called Kule Loklo is located at the Point Reyes National Seashore.

Cultural subdivisions 
In C. Hart Merriam's discussions with Coast Miwok peoples, he identified three cultural tribes: 

 Olamentko, pronounced O-la-MENT-ko (around Bodega Bay) and now called Olamentke
 Lekahtewutko, pronounced Lek-KAH-te-WUT-ko (in south-central Sonoma County) and now called Lekatuit
 Hookooeko, pronounced HOO-koo-EE-ko (in Marin County and southern Sonoma County), and now called Huukuiko, whom the Olamentko called Olumko, or "South People." 

These tribes did not have a political structure and so are not "tribes" in that sense. Rather, chiefs or headmen (oi-bu in Olamentko and hoipu in Hookooeko) were empowered at the tribelet level. The Coast Miwok did not have a single name for all three tribes, describing themselves instead by tribe, tribelet, or village, depending on the context. Using Merriam's divisions, the tribelets as shown on the map to the right - itself derived from Milliken - can be classified as:

 Olamentko
 Bodega Bay
 Lekahtewutko
 Bloomfield
 Hookooeko
 Alaguali
 Chocuyen
 Gualen
 Huimen
 Olema
 Olompali
 Omomi
 Petaluma (though Merriam puts the southernmost boundary of the Lekahtewutko a mile north of Petaluma and its associated villages, which is in the middle of Milliken's boundaries for this tribelet.)
 Tamal Aguasto (though the Tamal people lived in the Miller Creek watershed to the north in what is now Terra Linda and the Aguasto to the south, there was enough intermarriage in the early 19th Century that Milliken, the source of this article's map, lumps them into a single tribelet.)
 North Tomales Bay
 South Tomales Bay

Language
The Coast Miwok language is still spoken, but the Bodega dialect, spoken by the Olamentko group, is documented in Callaghan (1970). From speaking with Coast Miwok people in the early 1900s, Merriam believed that the Lekahtewutko and Hookooeko dialects were substantially the same.

Religion

The original Coast Miwok people world view included animism, and one form of this took was the Kuksu religion that was evident in Central and Northern California. This included elaborate acting and dancing ceremonies in traditional costume, an annual mourning ceremony, puberty rites of passage, shamanic intervention with the spirit world and an all-male society that met in subterranean dance rooms. Kuksu was shared with other indigenous ethnic groups of Central California, such as their neighbors the Pomo, also Maidu, Ohlone, Esselen, and northernmost Yokuts. However Kroeber observed less "specialized cosmogony" in the Miwok, which he termed one of the "southern Kuksu-dancing groups", in comparison to the Maidu and other northern California tribes.

Coast Miwok mythology and narratives were similar to those of other natives of Central and Northern California. The Coast Miwok believed in animal and human spirits, and saw the animal spirits as their ancestors. Coyote was seen as their ancestor and creator god. In their case the Earth began with land formed out of the Pacific Ocean.

Traditional narratives

In their myths, legends, tales, and histories, the Coast Miwok participated in the general cultural pattern of Central California.

Authentic villages
The authenticated Coast Miwok villages are:

On Bodega Bay: Helapattai, Hime-takala, Ho-takala, Suwutenne, Tiwut-huya, Tokau. Also in this vicinity: Awachi (at the mouth of Estero Americano Creek), Amayelle (on San Antonio Creek), Kennekono (at Bodega Corners). 
On Tomales Bay: Echa-kolum, Shotommo-wi (near the mouth of San Antonio Creek), Sakloki (opposite Tomales Point, Dillon Beach area), Utumia (Near present-day town of Tomales.)
At the present-day City of Petaluma: Etem, Petaluma (east of River). Also in this vicinity: Tuchayelin (northwest), Likatiut (on Petaluma River north of town), Meleya (on San Antonio Creek southwest of Petaluma), Susuli (northwest), Tulme (northwest), Wotoki (on the south side of the Petaluma River).
At the present-day City of San Rafael: Awani-wi.
At the present-day City of Sonoma: Huchi. Also in this vicinity:  Temblek (west), Tuli (northwest), Wugilwa (on Sonoma Creek).
At the present-day City of Cotati: Kotati, Lumen-takala (northeast). Also in this vicinity: Payinecha (west).
At the present-day town of Nicasio: Echa-tamal.
At the present-day town of Olema: Olema-loke.
At the present-day City of Sausalito: Liwanelowa.
Near the present-day town of Bolinas: Bauli-n
Near the present-day town of Freestone: Oye-yomi, Pakahuwe, Patawa-yomi.
Near the present-day town of Ignacio: Ewu, Puyuku (south), Shotokmo-cha (southeast).
Near the present-day City of Novato: Chokeche, Olompolli (northwest).
Near the present-day town of Valley Ford: Ewapalt, Uli-yomi (at the headwaters of Estero Americano Creek).
Near the present-day town of Salmon Creek: Pulya-lakum (on the ocean, near the mouth of Salmon Creek).

History

Documentation of Miwok peoples dates back as early as 1579 by a priest on a ship under the command of Sir Francis Drake. Other verification of occupancy exists from Spanish and Russian voyagers between 1595 and 1808. Over 1000 prehistoric charmstones and numerous arrowheads have been unearthed at Tolay Lake in Southern Sonoma County - some dating back 4000 years. The lake was thought to be a sacred site and ceremonial gathering and healing place for the Miwok and others in the region.

Coast Miwok would travel and camp on the coast and bays at peak fishing seasons.

After the Europeans arrived in California, the population declined from diseases introduced by the Europeans. Beginning in 1783, mission ecclesiastical records show that Coast Miwok individuals began to join Mission San Francisco de Asis, now known as Mission Dolores. They started joining that mission in large numbers in 1803, when the marriages of 49 couples from their Huimen and Guaulen local tribes (San Rafael and Bolinas Bay) appeared in the Mission San Francisco Book of Marriages. Local tribes from farther and farther north along the shore of San Pablo Bay moved to Mission San Francisco through the year 1812. Then in 1814 the Spanish authorities began to split the northern groups—Alagualis, Chocoimes (alias Sonomas), Olompalis, and Petalumas—sending a portion of each group to Mission San Francisco and another portion to Mission San Jose in the southeast portion of the San Francisco Bay Area. By the end of the year 1817, 850 Coast Miwok had been converted.

Mission San Rafael was founded by the Spanish Franciscans in Coast Miwok territory in the late fall of 1817. By that time the only Coast Miwok people still on their land were those on the Pacific Coast of the Marin Peninsula, from Point Reyes north to Bodega Bay. The Spanish authorities brought most of the Coast Miwoks who had been at Missions San Francisco and San Jose back north to form a founding population for Mission San Rafael. But some who had married Ohlone or Bay Miwok-speaking Mission Indians remained south of the Golden Gate. Over time in the 1820s Mission San Rafael became a mission for Coast Miwok and Pomo speakers. Mission San Francisco Solano, founded in 1823 in the Sonoma Valley (the easternmost traditional Coast Miwok region), came to be predominately a mission for Indians that spoke the Wappo or Patwin languages.

At the end of the Mission period (1769–1834) the Coast Miwoks were freed from the control of the Franciscan missionaries. At the same time the Mission lands were secularized and ceded to Californios. Most Coast Miwok began to live in servitude on the ranchos for the new California land grant owners, such as those who went to work for General Mariano G. Vallejo at Rancho Petaluma Adobe. The ranch owners were dependent upon the labor pool of Indians with agricultural and ranching skills. Other Miwok chose to live independently in bands like those at Rancho Olompali and Rancho Nicasio.

In 1837, a smallpox epidemic decimated all the native populations of the Sonoma region, and the Coast Miwok population continued to decline rapidly from other diseases brought in from the Spaniards as well as the Russians at Fort Ross.

By the beginning of California statehood (1850), many Miwok of Marin and Sonoma Counties were making the best of a difficult situation by earning their livelihoods through farm labor or fishing within their traditional homelands. Others chose to work as seasonal or year-round laborers on the ranches that were rapidly passing from Mexican ownership into Anglo-American ownership.

Olompali and Nicasio
After Mission San Rafael closed during the 1834-1836 period, the Mexican government deeded most of the land to Californios, but allowed the Indians ex-neophytes to own land at two locations within traditional Coast Miwok territory: Olompali and Nicasio.

The Coast Miwok leader Camilo Ynitia, secured a land grant of 2 sq. leagues known as Rancho Olompali, from Governor Micheltorena of Alta California in 1843, which included the prehistoric Miwok village of Olompali (his home village) and is north of present-day Novato.

The village of Olompali dates back to 500, had been a main center in 1200, and might have been the largest native village in Marin County. Ynitia held onto the Rancho Olompoli land title for 9 years, but in 1852 he sold most of the land to James Black of Marin. He retained  called Apalacocha. His daughter eventually sold Apalacocha.

The other Indian-owned rancho was at Rancho Nicasio northwest of San Rafael. Near the time of secularization (1835), the Church granted the San Rafael Christian Indians 20 leagues (80,000 acres, 320 km2) of mission lands from present-day Nicasio to the Tomales Bay. About 500 Indians relocated to Rancho Nicasio. By 1850 they had but one league of land left. This radical reduction of land was a result of illegal confiscation of land by non-Indians under protest by Indian residents. In 1870, José Calistro, the last community leader at Nicasio, purchased the small surrounding parcel. Calistro died in 1875, and in 1876 the land was transferred by his will to his four children. In 1880 there were 36 Indian people at Nicasio. The population was persuaded to leave in the 1880s when Marin County curtailed funds to all Indians (except those at Marshall) who were not living at the Poor Farm, a place for "indigent" peoples.

Some Coast Miwok persons were enslaved. In 1846, Joseph Warren Revere (career militant and grandson of Paul Revere) purchased Rancho San Geronimo. It was 8,701 acres of Coast Miwok land, first seized by Manuel Micheltorena in 1844 during the Mexican-American war. Revere forced enslaved Coast Miwok people to operate the plantation, selling timber and crops. 

By the early 20th century, a few Miwok families pursued fishing for their livelihoods; one family continued commercial fishing into the 1970s, while another family maintained an oyster harvesting business. When this activity was neither in season nor profitable, Indian people of this area sought agricultural employment, which required an itinerant lifestyle. The preferred locality for such work was within Marin and Sonoma counties.

Recognition

The Federated Indians of Graton Rancheria, formerly the Federated Coast Miwok, gained federal recognition of their tribal status in December 2000.  The new tribe consists of people of both Coast Miwok and Southern Pomo descent.

Population

Estimates for the pre-contact populations of most native groups in California have varied substantially. (See Population of Native California.) Alfred L. Kroeber put the 1770 population of the Coast Miwok at 1,500. Sherburne F. Cook raised this figure to 2,000.

The population in 1848 was estimated as 300, and it had dropped to 60 in 1880.

Notable Coast Miwoks

 José Calistro, was the last community leader at Nicasio.
 Chief Marin was a Coast Miwok of the Huimen local tribe, baptized at around age 20 in 1801 at Mission San Francisco and noted as an alcalde at Mission San Rafael in the 1820s. He died on March 15, 1839. Marin County and the Marin Islands are named in his honor. He was the "great chief of the tribe Licatiut", according to General Vallejo's semi-historical report to the first California State Legislature (1850). He was likely, then, of the Lekahtewutko from southern Sonoma County.
 Quintin, was renowned as the sub-chief of Marin and skipper at Mission Dolores, according to General Vallejo. San Quentin Peninsula (1840) is reputed to be named after him. San Quentin State Prison was added much later.
 Julia F. Parker, notable basket weaver.
 Ponponio (aka Pomponio) was baptized in 1803 at around age four at Mission San Francisco. He was a leader of a band of Native American fugitives in California who called themselves Los Insurgentes. Evading authorities, he was eventually captured in Marin County, and executed in Monterey in 1824.
Greg Sarris is the current Tribal Chairman of the Federated Indians of Graton Rancheria, also a college professor and author.
William Smith was born a Bodega Bay Coast Miwok (Olamentko), was forced relocation to Lake County during the late 19th century, but returned to Bodega Bay where he and his relatives founded the commercial fishing industry in the area.
Tsupu, a Coast Miwok elder
Camilo Ynitia (1816–1856) was a Coast Miwok leader who became the owner of an  land grant secured for the Miwok, named Rancho Olompali, now the Olompali State Historic Park. Ynitia also forged a ranch labor-alliance with General Vallejo, and secured semblance of peace with the white settlers (about 1830s-1840s).

See also
 Marin Museum of the American Indian, situated on the site of a former Coast Miwok settlement in Novato
 Fully feathered basket

Notes

References
 Cook, Sherburne. 1976. The Conflict Between the California Indian and White Civilization. Berkeley and Los Angeles, CA: University of California Press. .
 Goerke, Betty. 2007. Chief Marin, Leader, Rebel, and Legend: A History of Marin County's Namesake and his People. Berkeley, CA: Heyday Books. 
 Kroeber, Alfred L. 1907. The Religion of the Indians of California, University of California Publications in American Archaeology and Ethnology 4:#6. Berkeley, sections titled "Shamanism", "Public Ceremonies", "Ceremonial Structures and Paraphernalia", and "Mythology and Beliefs"; available at Sacred Texts Online
 Lightfoot, Kent and Otis Parrish. California Indians and Their Environment: An Introduction. Berkeley: University of California Press, 2009. .
 Milliken, Randall. 1995. A Time of Little Choice: The Disintegration of Tribal Culture in the San Francisco Bay Area 1769-1910. Menlo Park, CA: Ballena Press Publication. .
 Milliken, Randall. 2008. Native Americans at Mission San Jose. Banning, CA: Malki-Ballena Press Publication. .
 Reutinger, Joan. Olompali Park Filled With History , The Coastal Post, Sept. 1997.
 Silliman, Stephen. 2004. Lost Laborers in Colonial California, Native Americans and the Archaeology of Rancho Petaluma. Tucson, AZ: University of Arizona Press. .
 Shumway, Burgess M. 1988. California Ranchos: Patented Private Land Grants Listed by County. San Bernardino, CA: The Borgo Press. .
 Teather, Louise. Place Names of Marin. San Francisco, CA: Publisher Scottwall Associates, 1986. .

Further reading 

 Callaghan, Catherine. 1970. Bodega Miwok Dictionary. Berkeley, CA: University Of California Press.
 Kelly, Isabel. 1978. "Coast Miwok", in Handbook of North American Indians, vol. 8 (California). William C. Sturtevant, and Robert F. Heizer, eds. Washington, DC: Smithsonian Institution, 1978.  / 0160045754, pages 414-425.
 Kroeber, Alfred L. 1925. Handbook of the Indians of California. Washington, D.C: Bureau of American Ethnology Bulletin No. 78. (Chapter 30, The Miwok); available at Yosemite Online Library
 Merriam, C. Hart. 1916. "Indian Names in the Tamalpais Region. California Out-of-Doors No. 118, April, 1916.
 Burrows, Jack. Black Sun of the Miwok. Albuquerque: University of New Mexico, 2000.

External links 

Federated Indians of Graton Rancheria Web Site
Kule Loklo (Bear Valley) Coast Miwok village
Miwok Archeological Preserve of Marin
Native Tribes, Groups, Language Families and Dialects of California in 1770 (map after Kroeber)
U.S. National Park Service: Coast Miwok at Point Reyes
Coast Miwok Tribal Council of Marin Web Site

Native American tribes in Sonoma County
California Mission Indians
History of Sonoma County, California
History of the San Francisco Bay Area
History of Marin County, California
Miwok